The Broadbent Baronetcy, of Longwood in the Parish of Huddersfield in the West Riding of the County of York, and of Brook Street, in the Parish of St George Hanover Square in the County of London, is a title in the Baronetage of the United Kingdom. It was created on 10 August 1893 for the noted physician William Broadbent. The title descended from father to son until the death of his grandson, the third Baronet, in 1987. The late Baronet was succeeded by his first cousin once removed, the fourth Baronet. He was the grandson of Walter Broadbent, third son of the first Baronet.

As of 2016 the title is believed to be held by the fourth Baronet's son, the presumed fifth Baronet. However, he has not successfully proven his succession to the title and is therefore not on the Official Roll of the Baronetage, with the baronetcy considered dormant.

Broadbent baronets, of Longwood and Brook Street (1893)
Sir William Henry Broadbent, 1st Baronet (1835–1907)
Sir John Broadbent, 2nd Baronet (1865–1946)
Sir William Francis Broadbent, 3rd Baronet (1904–1987)
Sir George Walter Broadbent, 4th Baronet (1935–1992)
Andrew George Broadbent, presumed 5th Baronet (born 1963)

The heir presumptive is the current holder's cousin, Charles Richard Broadbent (born 1968).

References

Broadbent